The Yemen national futsal team represents Yemen in international futsal competitions and is controlled by the Yemen Football Association.

Tournament records

FIFA Futsal World Cup
 1989-2016 - Did not enter
 2020 - To be determined

AFC Futsal Championship
 1999-2018 - Did not enter

Futsal at the Asian Indoor and Martial Arts Games
 2005-2017 - Did not enter

WAFF Futsal Championship
 2007-2012 - Did not enter

Arab Futsal Championship
 1998-2007 - Did not enter 
 2008 - 1st round

Matches
Here are all the matches of Yemen national futsal team

References

 

Asian national futsal teams
Futsal
National
National futsal